The Clairvoyant is a British television sitcom by Roy Clarke, the creator of Last of the Summer Wine. It was produced by the BBC and aired from 1984 to 1986 on BBC2.

Synopsis
Roy Kinnear plays Arnold Bristow a car salesman who believes he has psychic powers after being knocked down by a car.

Cast
 Roy Kinnear as Arnold Bristow
 Sandra Dickinson as Lily
 Carmel Cryan as Carmen
 Glynis Brooks as Dawn
 Hugh Lloyd as Burma
 Shaun Curry as Newton

External links
 

1984 British television series debuts
1986 British television series endings
1980s British sitcoms
BBC television sitcoms
English-language television shows